Joan Morris (born February 10, 1943) is an American mezzo-soprano and cabaret singer.

Life and career
Born in Portland, Oregon, her musical partner and husband is composer/pianist William Bolcom. The couple specializes in older popular songs, primarily from the first half of the 20th century, but extending beyond that to include both contemporary cabaret, popular songs of the Gay Nineties, and a number of songs dating back to the 1860s.

Their recordings for Nonesuch, RCA, Columbia and Arabesque include songs by the great songwriters of the 1920s and 30s such as Kern, Gershwin, Porter, and Rodgers and Hart.  They also have performed and recorded songs by the rock-and-roll team of Jerry Leiber and Mike Stoller.

Together, they have taught at the University of Michigan for many years. Morris' performance style is nuanced and vibrant, and she is noted for honoring original versions of songs with historical accuracy. In early 2015 she announced that she and Bolcom would begin to curtail both the length and number of their concerts, offering the next year as an ad hoc "Farewell Tour" after which they would limit performances to "cameo appearances"..

2018 saw the publication of "Let Me Sing and I'm Happy," a brief memoir of her singing career and handbook of her approaches to song interpretation and performance.

Select discography
After the Ball: A Treasury of Turn-of-the-Century Popular Songs,  Nonesuch Records, 1974, H-71304 (Grammy Nominated)
Who Shall Rule This American Nation? (with Clifford Jackson and The Camerata Chorus,  Nonesuch, 1976
Vaudeville: Songs of The Great Ladies of The Musical Stage,  Nonesuch, 1976
Wild About Eubie (With Eubie Blake),  Columbia, 1977
These Charming People (with Max Morath),  RCA Red Seal, 1978
Songs By George and Ira Gershwin,  Nonesuch, 1978
The Girl On The Magazine Cover,  RCA, 1979
Blue Skies, Nonesuch, 1979
Other Songs By Leiber and Stoller, Nonesuch, 1980
The Rodgers and Hart Album (with Lucy Simon), RCA, 1981
More Rodgers and Hart (with Max Morath),  RCA, 1983
Silver Linings,  Arabesque, 1984
Black Max: The Cabaret Songs of Arnold Weinstein and William Bolcom,  RCA, 1985
Lime Jello: An American Cabaret,  RCA, 1986
Let's Do It,  Omega, 1989
Night and Day,  Omega, 1993
Fountain Favorites From The World of Coca-Cola (with Max Morath),  Coke, 1994
Orchids In The Moonlight,  Arabesque, 1996
The Carioca,  Arabesque, 1997
Moonlight Bay,  Albany, 1999
Bolcom and Morris Sing Yip Harburg (with Max Morath),  Original Cast, 2003
Bolcom and Morris Sing Gus Kahn (with Max Morath),  Original Cast, 2004
Someone Talked!,  Equilibrium, 2009
Autumn Leaves,  White Pine Records, 2015

Sources
Profile, FilmReference.com; accessed May 30, 2016.

References

External links
Interview with Joan Morris (and William Bolcom), June 29, 1986

Living people
1943 births
American mezzo-sopranos
Musicians from Portland, Oregon
Cabaret singers
University of Michigan faculty
Singers from Oregon
American women academics
Albany Records artists
21st-century American women